Pattern recognition is a field in machine learning.

Pattern recognition may also refer to:
Pattern recognition (psychology), identification of faces, objects, words, melodies, etc.
Pattern Recognition (novel), a 2003 novel by William Gibson
Pattern Recognition, an album by Sea Scouts
"Pattern Recognition", a song by Sonic Youth from Sonic Nurse
Pattern Recognition (journal)